The Victory of Conscience is a 1916 silent film drama produced by Jesse L. Lasky at Famous Players-Lasky and distributed by Paramount Pictures. Frank Reicher directed and Lou Tellegen and Cleo Ridgely star.

Cast
Cleo Ridgely - Rosette Burgod
Lou Tellegen - Louis, Count De Tavannes
Elliott Dexter - Prince Dimitri Karitzin
Thomas Delmar - Remy
Laura Woods Cushing - Mother Burgod
John McKinnon - Father Burgod

Preservation status
The film is preserved at the Library of Congress.

References

External links

1916 films
American silent feature films
Films directed by George Melford
Paramount Pictures films
1916 drama films
American black-and-white films
Silent American drama films
1910s American films